Bruno Olivier Cheyrou (born 10 May 1978) is a French former professional footballer who played as a midfielder.

Club career 
Cheyrou was born in Suresnes, Hauts-de-Seine. After success with Lille OSC, where he scored against Manchester United in the UEFA Champions League, Cheyrou attracted interest from a number of clubs around Europe, most notably Liverpool. Gérard Houllier had the player scouted for several months by scout David Murray before deciding to sign him in the summer of 2002 for £4.5 million (€6.5m).

On signing him, Houllier dubbed Cheyrou the "new Zidane". Over time this tag proved to be a burden as he failed to live up to expectations. His first Liverpool goal came against Spartak Moscow in the Champions League, however this would be his only goal of the 2002–03 season. Despite being left out of Liverpool's squad for the victorious 2003 Football League Cup Final he contributed in the earlier rounds, and was on the pitch as Liverpool secured their place in the final by beating Sheffield United.

A spell of four goals in five games over the Christmas period of the 2003–04 season at one time suggested his Liverpool career may make a turn for the better. Arguably, the highlight of Cheyrou's Liverpool career was the winning goal he scored in the 33rd minute at Chelsea during the 2003–04 season. He only scored once more in the league for Liverpool, in the 1–1 draw at Wolves in January 2004. Three days later Cheyrou had another memorable game for Liverpool in the FA Cup where he scored twice to help Liverpool beat Newcastle 2–1.

At the beginning of the 2004–05 season, new manager Rafael Benítez deemed Cheyrou surplus to requirements and immediately loaned him to Marseille in a season-long deal. He played 20 times for the club, scoring one goal. In the 2005–06 season, he was once again sent on a season-long loan, this time to Bordeaux, with a view to a permanent move; however, this failed to materialise. Ahead of the following season, he made a permanent move to Rennes and played there for three and a half seasons, scoring some goals.  In January 2010 Anorthosis Famagusta signed the midfielder from Stade Rennes. After six months with Anorthosis, the 32-year-old midfielder returned to France and signed a two-year contract for FC Nantes.

International career 
Cheyrou has been capped three times by the France national team between 2002 and 2004, making his senior international debut on 21 August 2002 in a 1–1 draw against Tunisia.

Personal life 
Bruno has a younger brother, Benoît Cheyrou, who played for Toronto FC. Cheyrou and his wife Constance have a son born 2007 in France.

Career statistics

Honours

Club 
Lille
Division 2: 1999–2000

Liverpool
FA Community Shield runner-up: 2002

References

External links 
LFChistory.net player profile
Bruno Cheyrou's profile, stats & pics
Photos and stats at sporting-heroes.net

 
 

1978 births
Living people
Sportspeople from Suresnes
French footballers
France international footballers
Lille OSC players
Liverpool F.C. players
Olympique de Marseille players
FC Girondins de Bordeaux players
Stade Rennais F.C. players
Anorthosis Famagusta F.C. players
FC Nantes players
Premier League players
Ligue 1 players
Ligue 2 players
Cypriot First Division players
French expatriate footballers
Expatriate footballers in England
Expatriate footballers in Cyprus
French expatriate sportspeople in England
French expatriate sportspeople in Cyprus
Association football midfielders
Footballers from Hauts-de-Seine